The coat of arms of Uruguay or Uruguayan shield (Spanish: Escudo de Armas del Estado) was first adopted by law on March 19, 1829, and later on had some minor modification in 1906 and 1908. It was supposedly designed by Juan Manuel Besnes Irigoyen (1788–1865).

Description 
It consists of an oval shield, which is divided into four equal sections and crowned by a rising golden sun, the “Sun of May”, symbolizing the rising of the Uruguayan nation and the May Revolution. The oval is surrounded by a laurel branch on the left and an olive one on the right, representing honor and peace, joined at the bottom by a light blue ribbon, the former uruguayan cockade.

In the upper left quarter there is a golden scale on a blue background, symbol of equality and justice. 

The upper right quarter contains the Cerro de Montevideo (Montevideo Hill) with its fortress on top on a silver background, as a symbol of strength.

In the lower left, also on a silver background, there is a galloping black horse, symbolizing liberty. 

The lower right quarter holds a golden ox on blue background, as a symbol of abundance.

Modifications 
From 1829 the coat of arms was ornamented with multiple Uruguayan Flags on each side, weapons, and various elements of commerce, in 1906 the design was simplified by law eliminating all ornaments and standardizing the design.

Historical coats of arms

Departamental shields

See also 
 Flag of Uruguay
 Sun of May#Historical reference

Sources
 Heraldry of the World: Uruguay
 FlagsoftheWorld.com: Uruguay coat of arms

National symbols of Uruguay
Uruguay
Uruguay
Uruguay
Uruguay
Uruguay
Uruguay
Uruguay
Uruguay